Ruili Airlines Co., Ltd. is a Chinese Low Cost Carrier (LCC) based at Kunming Changshui International Airport. It provides both domestic and international services to destinations in China and in Southeast Asia (Chiang Mai, Chiang Rai and Sihanoukville), using Boeing 737 aircraft.

History
The airline was established in 2014 and is wholly owned by the Yunnan Jingcheng Group. It received its Air operator's certificate on 22 January 2014.  Its first service, between Kunming and Mangshi, was launched on 18 May 2014.

Destinations
As of March 2018, the airline serves 34 destinations in China and in Southeast Asia.

Fleet

Current fleet
, the Ruili Airlines fleet consists of the following aircraft:

Fleet development
The airline received its two Boeing 737-700s from Air Berlin (formerly D-ABLE and D-ABLF) on January 6, 2014. However, the aircraft were returned to Southwest Airlines in May 2015. The first 737-800 was received on 30 March 2014 and the direct purchase Boeing 737-700 from Boeing was on 25 November 2014. It has orders and commitments for a further 13 Boeing 737 aircraft (7 Boeing 737-700 and 6 Boeing 737 MAX). The first Boeing 737-900ER was scheduled for delivered in December 2015 which is an ex Spicejet Aircraft.

In mid-2015, the airline signed a commitment to purchase and lease 60 Boeing 737 MAX aircraft, subject to final negotiations.

In July 2016, Ruili Airlines finalized an order for 6 Boeing 787-9 aircraft. The deal is worth US$1.59 billion.

Incidents
 On July 8, 2020, a Ruili Airlines Boeing 737 on a domestic flight from X'ian to Kunming suffered a cracked cockpit windscreen. The pilots conducted an accelerated descent and the plane made an emergency landing at Chongqing Jiangbei International Airport in Chongqing. Nobody among the 178 passengers or flight crew aboard was reported injured.

References

External links

Companies based in Kunming
Low-cost carriers
Airlines of China
Airlines established in 2014
Chinese brands
Chinese companies established in 2014